Songs of Good Taste is an extended play by the German gothic metal band The Vision Bleak, as well as their first official studio release overall. It was self-released by the band on 31 January 2001, and re-released by their long-time label Prophecy Productions on 1 January 2004.

Track listing

Personnel

The Vision Bleak
 Ulf Theodor Schwadorf (Markus Stock) – guitars, bass
 Allen B. Konstanz (Tobias Schönemann) – vocals, drums

References

External links
 The Vision Bleak's official website

The Vision Bleak albums
2001 debut EPs